In mathematics, particularly in algebra, the class of projective modules enlarges the class of free modules (that is, modules with basis vectors) over a ring, by keeping some of the main properties of free modules. Various equivalent characterizations of these modules appear below.

Every free module is a projective module, but the converse fails to hold over some rings, such as Dedekind rings that are not principal ideal domains. However, every projective module is a free module if the ring is a principal ideal domain such as the integers, or a polynomial ring (this is the Quillen–Suslin theorem).

Projective modules were first introduced in 1956 in the influential book Homological Algebra by Henri Cartan and Samuel Eilenberg.

Definitions

Lifting property 

The usual category theoretical definition is in terms of the property of lifting that carries over from free to projective modules: a module P is projective if and only if for every surjective module homomorphism  and every module homomorphism , there exists a module homomorphism  such that . (We don't require the lifting homomorphism h to be unique; this is not a universal property.)

The advantage of this definition of "projective" is that it can be carried out in categories more general than module categories: we don't need a notion of "free object". It can also be dualized, leading to injective modules. Thus, by definition, projective modules are precisely the projective objects in the category of R-modules.

Split-exact sequences 
A module P is projective if and only if every short exact sequence of modules of the form

is a split exact sequence. That is, for every surjective module homomorphism  there exists a section map, that is, a module homomorphism  such that f&hairsp;h = idP&hairsp;. Equivalently,

Direct summands of free modules 

A module P is projective if and only if there is another module Q such that the direct sum of P and Q is a free module.

Exactness 

An R-module P is projective if and only if the covariant functor  is an exact functor, where  is the category of left R-modules and Ab is the category of abelian groups. This functor is always left exact, but, when P is projective, it is also right exact. This means that P is projective if and only if this functor preserves epimorphisms (surjective homomorphisms), or if it preserves finite colimits.

Dual basis

Elementary examples and properties 
The following properties of projective modules are quickly deduced from any of the above (equivalent) definitions of projective modules:
 Direct sums and direct summands of projective modules are projective.
 If  is an idempotent in the ring R, then Re is a projective left module over R.

Relation to other module-theoretic properties

The relation of projective modules to free and flat modules is subsumed in the following diagram of module properties:

The left-to-right implications are true over any ring, although some authors define torsion-free modules only over a domain. The right-to-left implications are true over the rings labeling them. There may be other rings over which they are true. For example, the implication labeled "local ring or PID" is also true for polynomial rings over a field: this is the Quillen–Suslin theorem.

Projective vs. free modules
Any free module is projective. The converse is true in the following cases:
 if R is a field or skew field: any module is free in this case.
 if the ring R is a principal ideal domain. The reason is that any submodule of a free module over a principal ideal domain is free.
 if the ring R is a local ring. This fact is the basis of the intuition of "locally free = projective". This fact is easy to prove for finitely generated projective modules.

In general though, projective modules need not be free:
 Over a Dedekind domain a non-principal ideal is always a projective module that is not a free module.
 Over a matrix ring Mn(R), the natural module R&hairsp;n is projective but not free.  More generally, over any semisimple ring, every module is projective, but the zero ideal and the ring itself are the only free ideals.
The difference between free and projective modules is, in a sense, measured by the algebraic K-theory group K0(R); see below.

Projective vs. flat modules
Every projective module is flat. The converse is in general not true: the abelian group Q is a Z-module which is flat, but not projective.

Conversely, a finitely related flat module is projective.

 and  proved that a module M is flat if and only if it is a direct limit of finitely-generated free modules.

M is flat,
M is a direct sum of countably generated modules,
M satisfies a certain Mittag-Leffler type condition.
In other words, the property of being projective satisfies faithfully flat descent.

The category of projective modules
Submodules of projective modules need not be projective; a ring R for which every submodule of a projective left module is projective is called left hereditary.

Quotients of projective modules also need not be projective, for example Z/n is a quotient of Z, but not torsion-free, hence not flat, and therefore not projective.

The category of finitely generated projective modules over a ring is an exact category. (See also algebraic K-theory).

Projective resolutions 

Given a module, M, a projective resolution of M is an infinite exact sequence of modules
··· → Pn → ··· → P2 → P1 → P0 → M → 0,
with all the Pi s projective. Every module possesses a projective resolution. In fact a free resolution (resolution by free modules) exists. A classic example of a projective resolution is given by the Koszul complex of a regular sequence, which is a free resolution of the ideal generated by the sequence.

If M admits a finite projective resolution, the minimal length among all finite projective resolutions of M is called its projective dimension and denoted pd(M). If M does not admit a finite projective resolution, then by convention the projective dimension is said to be infinite. As an example, consider a module M such that . In this situation, the exactness of the sequence 0 → P0 → M → 0 indicates that the arrow in the center is an isomorphism, and hence M itself is projective.

Projective modules over commutative rings 
Projective modules over commutative rings have nice properties.

The localization of a projective module is a projective module over the localized ring.
A projective module over a local ring is free. Thus a projective module is locally free (in the sense that its localization at every prime ideal is free over the corresponding localization of the ring).

The converse is true for finitely generated modules over Noetherian rings: a finitely generated module over a commutative Noetherian ring is locally free if and only if it is projective.

However, there are examples of finitely generated modules over a non-Noetherian ring which are locally free and not projective.  For instance, 
a Boolean ring has all of its localizations isomorphic to F2, the field of two elements, so any module over a Boolean ring is locally free, but 
there are some non-projective modules over Boolean rings.  One example is R/I where 
R is a direct product of countably many copies of F2 and I is the direct sum of countably many copies of F2 inside of R.
The R-module R/I is locally free since R is Boolean (and it is finitely generated as an R-module too, with a spanning set of size 1), but R/I is not projective because 
I is not a principal ideal.  (If a quotient module R/I, for any commutative ring R and ideal I, is a projective R-module then I is principal.)

However, it is true that for finitely presented modules M over a commutative ring R (in particular if M is a finitely generated R-module and R is Noetherian), the following are equivalent.
 is flat.
 is projective.
 is free as -module for every maximal ideal  of R.
 is free as -module for every prime ideal  of R.
There exist  generating the unit ideal such that  is free as -module for each i.  
Moreover, if R is a Noetherian integral domain, then, by Nakayama's lemma, these conditions are equivalent to
That is to say, M has constant rank (as defined below).

Let A be a commutative ring. If B is a (possibly non-commutative) A-algebra that is a finitely generated projective A-module containing A as a subring, then A is a direct factor of B.

Rank 

Let P be a finitely generated projective module over a commutative ring R and X be the spectrum of R. The rank of P at a prime ideal  in X is the rank of the free -module .  It is a locally constant function on X. In particular, if X is connected (that is if R has no other idempotents than 0 and 1), then P has constant rank.

Vector bundles and locally free modules 

A basic motivation of the theory is that projective modules (at least over certain commutative rings) are analogues of vector bundles. This can be made precise for the ring of continuous real-valued functions on a compact Hausdorff space, as well as for the ring of smooth functions on a smooth manifold (see Serre–Swan theorem that says a finitely generated projective module over the space of smooth functions on a compact manifold is the space of smooth sections of a smooth vector bundle).

Vector bundles are locally free. If there is some notion of "localization" which can be carried over to modules, such as the usual localization of a ring, one can define locally free modules, and the projective modules then typically coincide with the locally free modules.

Projective modules over a polynomial ring 
This problem was first raised by Serre with K a field (and the modules being finitely generated).  Bass settled it for non-finitely generated modules, and Quillen and Suslin independently and simultaneously treated the case of finitely generated modules.

Since every projective module over a principal ideal domain is free, one might ask this question: if R is a commutative ring such that every (finitely generated) projective R-module is free, then is every (finitely generated) projective R[X]-module free?  The answer is no.  A counterexample occurs with R equal to the local ring of the curve  at the origin.  Thus the Quillen-Suslin theorem could never be proved by a simple induction on the number of variables.

See also 

Projective cover
Schanuel's lemma
Bass cancellation theorem
Modular representation theory

Notes

References
 
 
 Nicolas Bourbaki, Commutative algebra, Ch. II, §5
 
 
 
 
 
 
 

 
 Donald S. Passman (2004) A Course in Ring Theory, especially chapter 2 Projective modules, pp 13–22, AMS Chelsea,  .
 
 Paulo Ribenboim (1969) Rings and Modules, §1.6 Projective modules, pp 19–24, Interscience Publishers.
 Charles Weibel, The K-book: An introduction to algebraic K-theory

Further reading 
 https://mathoverflow.net/questions/272018/faithfully-flat-descent-of-projectivity-for-non-commutative-rings

Homological algebra
Module theory